Israel Joaquín González Nuñez (born 16 February 1975) is a Spanish professional basketball coach for the German Bundesliga team ALBA Berlin.

Coaching career
In 2017, Gonzalez signed with Alba Berlin to become an assistant coach under head coach, Aíto García Reneses. He helped the team to capture its first German League title since 2009, and their first German Cup since 2016.

Personal life
He graduated with the degree of Physical Education at Facultad de Ciencias de la actividad Física y Deporte.

References

External links
 

1975 births
Living people
Alba Berlin basketball coaches
CB Gran Canaria coaches
Spanish basketball coaches